Erragadda is a developing  commercial and residential area in the west zone of Hyderabad, Telangana, India. It is home to the ECE Industries, an electrical enterprise. Popular landmarks are the Gokul theater and St. Theresa's Hospital  which was constructed in the 1980s or 1970s respectively. It is administered as Ward No. 101 of Greater Hyderabad Municipal Corporation. The corporator is Shaikh Tajuddin.

Health 

Medical institutions such as the St. Theresa's Hospital, and government institutions such as the Institute of Mental Health, Tuberculosis and Chest hospital are located here.

Transport
Erragadda is well connected by TSRTC buses to all parts of the city. But roads are narrow at junctions as well as lack of proper traffic control causes traffic jams at peak hours.

The nearest MMTS station is located at Bharat nagar, less than half kilometer away.

References

External links

Neighbourhoods in Hyderabad, India
Municipal wards of Hyderabad, India